Alfred William Compigne (February 7, 1818 – July 4, 1909) was a settler and politician of Queensland, Australia. He was a Member of the Queensland Legislative Council.

Early life
Alfred William Compigné was born at Gosport, Hampshire, England on 2 February 1818. He immigrated to Sydney, New South Wales on 30 June 1839, coming to Queensland in 1846.

Alfred Compigné acquired Nindooinbah Station on the Albert River and was the first pastoralist to take up land on the coast south of Coomera.  He applied successfully for the leasehold of two properties to the south of Brisbane settlement being Dungogie and Murry Jerry runs in March 1852.  Just five months later in August 1952 he transferred the coastal runs to William Duckett White of Beaudesert Station. In his footnotes regarding Compigne, Longhurst accounts that while Compigne ran up to 7,000 sheep on Nindooinbah Station he eventually failed as a squatter.

Politics
Compigne was appointed as a founding Member of the  Queensland Legislative Council on 1 May 1860. He served for four years before resigning on 23 April 1864.

Later life
Compigne died from senile decay at his residence, Richmond Villa, on Sunday 4 July 1909 and was buried in Toowong Cemetery.

See also
 Members of the Queensland Legislative Council, 1860–1869

References

1818 births
1909 deaths
People from Gosford
English emigrants to colonial Australia
Burials at Toowong Cemetery
Members of the Queensland Legislative Council
19th-century Australian politicians
Pre-Separation Queensland